Mortimer Martin McQuaid  (June 28, 1861 – March 5, 1928), was a professional baseball second baseman and outfielder in Major League Baseball for the 1891 St. Louis Browns and 1898 Washington Senators.

External links

1861 births
1928 deaths
Major League Baseball second basemen
Major League Baseball outfielders
Baseball players from Illinois
St. Louis Browns (AA) players
Washington Senators (1891–1899) players
19th-century baseball players
Peoria Canaries players
Denver Grizzlies (baseball) players
Denver Mountaineers players
Minneapolis Millers (baseball) players
Evansville Hoosiers players
Oakland Colonels players
Kansas City Cowboys (minor league) players
Indianapolis Hoosiers (minor league) players
Marinette Badgers players
Nashville Tigers players
Chattanooga Warriors players
Lincoln Treeplanters players
Harrisburg Senators players
Hazleton Barons players
Carbondale Anthracites players
Syracuse Stars (minor league baseball) players
Lancaster Maroons players
Peoria Distillers players
Ottumwa Giants players
Stockton Wasps players
Des Moines Hawkeyes players
Spokane Blue Stockings players
Decatur Commodores players
Alameda Grays players
Minor league baseball managers